The Second Stage Turbine Blade is the debut studio album released by rock band Coheed and Cambria. It was originally released on March 5, 2002 through Equal Vision Records. It is their first album and part two of a tetralogy, telling the story of The Amory Wars. It was re-released on September 20, 2005, and included three previously unreleased bonus tracks.

Story
The album introduces the husband and wife characters Coheed and Cambria, the characters from whom the band's name originates.

This album is one of five Coheed and Cambria albums (the others being Year of the Black Rainbow, the non-conceptual The Color Before the Sun, Vaxis – Act I: The Unheavenly Creatures, and Vaxis – Act II: A Window of the Waking Mind) not to have a multi-part suite, as In Keeping Secrets of Silent Earth: 3 had the "Camper Velourium" series, Good Apollo, I'm Burning Star IV, Volume One: From Fear Through the Eyes of Madness had the "Willing Well" series, Good Apollo, I'm Burning Star IV, Volume Two: No World for Tomorrow had the "End Complete" series, and The Afterman: Ascension and Descension albums had the "Key Entity Extraction" series.

Track listing

Note: On the standard ten-track edition, the hidden track "IRO-Bot" is contained in "God Send Conspirator"; however, on the deluxe edition, it is contained in the "Everything Evil" demo.

Personnel
Coheed and Cambria
Claudio Sanchez – vocals, rhythm guitar
Josh Eppard – drums, piano
Michael Todd – bass, vocals
Travis Stever – lead guitar

Additional
Michael Birnbaum – production, mixing
Chris Bittner – production, mixing
Jayson Dezuzio – recording, pre-production
Roger Lian – mastering
Nate Kelley – drums (on "Delirium Trigger" and "33")
Dr. Know – guitar (on "Time Consumer")
Todd Martin – recording (on "Delirium Trigger" and "33")
Montana Masback – additional vocals (on "Hearshot Kid Disaster")

Tie-in comics
In the summer of 2004, Evil Ink Comics released a series of ten comic books as a tie-in to the album. Written by Claudio Sanchez and illustrated by Wes Abbot, the comics tell the story of Coheed and Cambria Kilgannon, a married couple who become unwittingly involved in interplanetary intrigue.

References

Coheed and Cambria albums
2002 debut albums
Science fiction concept albums
Equal Vision Records albums
Rock operas
The Amory Wars
Defiance Records albums